A National Diploma is a standard academic qualification, offered by most further education colleges and universities in Sri Lanka.

National Diplomas
National Diploma in Technology
National Diploma in Engineering Sciences
National Diploma in Information Technology 

NATIONAL DIPLOMA IN INFORMATION TECHNOLOGY (NDICT) 
( NVQ LEVEL 5) NATIONAL VOCATIONAL QUALIFICATION FRAMEWORK
PROVIDED BY VOCATIONAL TRAINING AUTHORITY OF SRI LANKA 
(VTASL) AND (NAITA)
HIGH STANDARD IT QUALIFICATION WITH SKILL DEVELOPMENT
VOCATIONAL QUALIFICATION (NVQ LEVEL 5) DIPLOMA

(NVQ level 5, can enter for the 2nd year in most of the local &foreign universities where the relevant field is available)
is equal to a degree with experiences.

Higher National Diplomas
 HNDA (Higher National Diploma in Accountancy)
 HNDBA (Higher National Diploma in Business Administration)
 HNDBF (Higher National Diploma in Business Finance)
 HNDBSE (Higher National Diploma in Building Service Engineering)
 HNDFT (Higher National Diploma in Food Technology)
 HNDE (Higher National Diploma in Engineering)
 HND in English
 HNDIT (Higher National Diploma in Information Technology
 HNDM (Higher National Diploma in Management)
 HNDT - Agri (Higher National Diploma in Technology)
 HNDTHM (Higher National Diploma in Tourism and Hospitality Management)
 HNDQS (Higher National Diploma in Quantity Survey)

Educational qualifications in Sri Lanka